Brunning is a surname. Notable people with the surname include:

 Bob Brunning (1943–2011), British musician
 Herb Brunning (1886–1947), Australian rules footballer
 Herbie Brunning (1899–1969), Australian rules footballer
 John Brunning (born 1954), English musician
 Nancy Brunning (1971–2019), actress and director 
 Noel Brunning, Australian television presenter

See also
 Bruning (disambiguation)